Harry John Martin (born 23 October 1992) is an English field hockey player who plays as a midfielder for HC Rotterdam and the England and Great Britain national teams.

His sister, Hannah Martin is an English field hockey player who plays as a midfielder or forward for England and Great Britain.

Club career
For the 2021–22 season he returns to play club hockey in the Dutch Hoofdklasse for HC Rotterdam, for whom he enjoyed a successful 2016–17 season.

He had been playing in the Men's England Hockey League Premier Division for Hampstead & Westminster.

Prior to that, he won the Men's England Hockey League Premier Division title in consecutive seasons with Beeston Hockey Club.

International career
Martin made his senior debut, aged 17, for  Great Britain on 12 July 2010. One year later, On 1 December 2012, he made his senior tournament debut for England in a 3–1 defeat against India, in the 2012 Champions Trophy, in Melbourne, Australia. He was the first player who has been involved in England Hockey's Single System (long term athlete development pathway) to be selected for an Olympic Games. He played in the 2010 Commonwealth Games in Delhi, the 2011 & 2012 Champions Trophy. At the 2012 Summer Olympics, he competed for Great Britain in the tournament. He was also shortlisted for the FIH World Young Player of the Year Award in 2012. On 28 May 2021, he was selected in the England squad for the 2021 EuroHockey Championship.

References

External links

1992 births
Living people
Sportspeople from Ipswich
English male field hockey players
British male field hockey players
Male field hockey midfielders
Field hockey players at the 2012 Summer Olympics
2014 Men's Hockey World Cup players
Field hockey players at the 2014 Commonwealth Games
Field hockey players at the 2016 Summer Olympics
Field hockey players at the 2020 Summer Olympics
Field hockey players at the 2018 Commonwealth Games
2018 Men's Hockey World Cup players
Olympic field hockey players of Great Britain
Commonwealth Games medallists in field hockey
Commonwealth Games bronze medallists for England
Expatriate field hockey players
English expatriate sportspeople in the Netherlands
Beeston Hockey Club players
Hampstead & Westminster Hockey Club players
HC Rotterdam players
Men's Hoofdklasse Hockey players
Men's England Hockey League players
2023 Men's FIH Hockey World Cup players
Medallists at the 2014 Commonwealth Games
Medallists at the 2018 Commonwealth Games